Francesca Emanuel  (September 19, 1933 – April 8, 2020) was Nigeria's first female administrative officer and first federal permanent secretary. She was awarded Commander of Order of the Niger (CON).

Early life
She was born on 19 September 1933, and had her secondary education in Holy Child College, Lagos and attended University of Ibadan, where she obtained a bachelor's degree in Geography.

Education 
Francesca Emanuel was a graduate from University of Ibadan where she studied geography. In 1955, she obtained the Inter-B.A. and transferred to the University College, London for her main degree. In 1959, she graduated with a Bachelor of Arts (B.A.) Honours degree in Geography.

Career
Mrs. Francesca Emanuel (née Pereira) was a civil servant. She joined the Federal Nigerian Civil Service in 1959 as the first female Administrative Officer where she started work as an assistant secretary at the Federal Ministry of Works and Housing between 1959-1960.

During her career, she worked at the Federal Ministry of Establishment (1960-1961), the Police Affairs Division in the Cabinet Office (1961-1964). She was appointed senior assistant secretary, Secretariat of the Morgan Commission on Nigerian Workers, in 1964. She was the under-secretary for the Federal Ministry of Commerce and Industry (1964-1969).
She served as the deputy-secretary at the Federal Ministry of Works and Housing (1969-1973). Francesca was the principal secretary for the Cabinet Office (1973-1974) and secretary for the Federal Public Service Commission in 1975. 
Her appointment as permanent secretary in the Public Service Department of the Cabinet Office, in July 1975 made her the first female Federal Permanent Secretary where she served for 13 years.

Due to the pioneering role she played in the post-colonial civil service, she received the Retirement Award for Brilliant Performances and Outstanding Achievement by the Federal Directors-General (Permanent Secretaries) when she voluntarily retired in 1988.

Arts 
At the first Nigerian Festival of the Arts in Lagos in 1950, she won her first prize as a soprano solo and then she was still a secondary school student. She was also a member of the pioneer musical group known as the Steve Rhodes Voices.
She was also an actress and featured in Wole Soyinka’s earliest plays in the 1960s. She was also cast in his first major play titled A Dance of the Forests which was performed at the Nigerian Independence celebrations in 1960.  She was a member of Soyinka’s professional theatre company, called the 1960 Masks. She ended up getting recognised at the Glover Memorial Centennial Award for Services to Arts and Culture in Lagos State in 2000.
She was on the Board of Governors as well as a member of the Musical Society of Nigeria when they opened MUSON Centre, Onikan, Lagos. She was a performer who helped in nurturing different Aesthetics Arts and Culture Management and has administered projects such as The MUSON Festival, The 2nd National Film Festival and the Macmillan Literary events. 
She was also a member on the Board of Trustees of the National Association of Nigerian Theatre Arts Practitioners (NANTAP). She actively supported many organisations such as the Lumina Foundation headed by Dr Promise Ogochukwu, Crown Troupe of Africa led by Segun Adefila, the Bariga Artists Forum, and the Artist Village, National Theatre Annex. She held both member and leadership positions in several public and private organisations such as Governing Board of the Federal Society for the Blind (1992), Board of the Special Olympic Nigeria (1989), and Fund Raising Committee of the Nigerian Sickle Cell Foundation (1977). She was a founding member of the Nigerian Conservation Foundation.

Personal life 
In 1964, she married her husband Dr Leonard Abosede Emmanuel, an obstetrician and gynaecologist. The couple had only one child who they named Muyiwa.

She died on April 8, 2020 at the age of 86.

Awards
The Federal Directors-General (permanent Secretaries) awarded her a Retirement Award for Brilliant Performances and Outstanding Achievement.
Glover Memorial Centennial Award for Services to Arts and Culture in Lagos State in 2000.
The Commander of the Order of the Niger, CON.

References

Commanders of the Order of the Niger
1933 births
2020 deaths
Nigerian civil servants
Holy Child College alumni
University of Ibadan alumni
Women civil servants
Alumni of University College London
Nigerian stage actresses
20th-century Nigerian actresses